India is an unincorporated community in Ellis County, Texas, United States. An old variant name was Morgan.

History
The first settlement at India, originally called Morgan, was made in 1853. A post office was established under the name India in 1892, and remained in operation until it was discontinued in 1904.

References

Unincorporated communities in Ellis County, Texas
Unincorporated communities in Texas